Coffee production in Colombia has a reputation for producing mild, well-balanced coffee beans. Colombia's average annual coffee production of 11.5 million bags is the third total highest in the world, after Brazil and Vietnam, though highest in terms of the arabica bean. The beans are exported to United States, Germany, France, Japan, and Italy. Most coffee is grown in the Colombian coffee growing axis region, while other regions focus on quality instead of volumes, such as Sierra Nevada de Santa Marta. In 2007, the European Union granted Colombian coffee a protected designation of origin status. In 2011, UNESCO declared the "Coffee Cultural Landscape" of Colombia, a World Heritage site.

The coffee plant had spread to Colombia by 1790. The oldest written testimony of the presence of coffee in Colombia is attributed to a Jesuit priest, José Gumilla. In his book The Orinoco Illustrated (1730), he registered the presence of coffee in the mission of Saint Teresa of Tabajé, near where the Meta river empties into the Orinoco. Further testimony comes from the archbishop-viceroy Caballero y Gongora (1787) who registered the presence of the crop in the north east of the country near Giron (Santander) and Muzo (Boyaca) in a report that he provided to the Spanish authorities.

Early cultivation

The first coffee crops were planted in the eastern part of the country. In 1808 the first commercial production was registered with 100 green coffee bags (60 kg each) that were exported from the port of Cucuta, near the border with Venezuela. A priest named Francisco Romero is attributed to have been very influential in the propagation of the crop in the northeast region of the country. After hearing the confession of the parishioners of the town of Salazar de la Palmas, he required as penance the cultivation of coffee. Coffee became established in the departments of Santander and North Santander, Cundinamarca, Antioquia, and the historic region of Caldas.

Exportation

Despite these early developments, the consolidation of coffee as a Colombian export did not come about until the second half of the 19th century. The great expansion that the world economy underwent at that time allowed Colombian landowners to find attractive opportunities in international markets. Little by little, the United States became the most important consumer of coffee in the world, while Germany and France became the most important markets in Europe.

Setbacks

The then large Colombian landowners had already tried to exploit the new opportunities that the expansion of the international markets offered. Between 1850 and 1857 the country experienced a significant increase in tobacco and quinine exports, and thereafter leather and live cattle. These early efforts in the export of agricultural commodities turned out too fragile; they in fact were only reactionary attempts to find the greatest profitability from the high international prices of the time, rather than attempts to create a solid and diversified export platform. The production of these sectors went into a period of decline when the respective bonanza of their international prices terminated, hence a true industrial consolidation was prevented.

With the fall of international prices that registered the transition from the 19th to the 20th century, the profitability of the large estates plummeted. As if this was not enough, the Thousand Days War, which took place during the first years of the new century, also negatively influenced the important landowners, making it impossible for them to maintain their plantations in good conditions; this circumstance summed to the fact that these producers had incurred in large amounts of foreign debt in order to further develop their plantations, which finally ruined them. The coffee estates of Santander and North Santander entered into crisis and the estates of Cundinamarca and Antioquia stalled.

Consequences

The crisis that affected the large estates brought with it one of the most significant changes of the Colombian coffee industry. Since 1875, the number of small coffee producers had begun to grow in Santander as well as in some regions of Antioquia and in the region referred to as Viejo or Old Caldas. In the first decades of the 20th century a new model to develop coffee exports based on the rural economy had already been consolidated, supported by internal migration and the colonization of new territories in the center and western regions of the country, principally in the departments of Antioquia, Caldas, Valle, and in the northern part of Tolima. Both the expansion of this new coffee model and the crisis that affected the large estates allowed the western regions of Colombia to take the lead in the development of the coffee industry in the country.

This transformation was very favorable for the owners of the small coffee estates that were entering the coffee market. The cultivation of coffee was a very attractive option for local farmers, as it offered the possibility of making permanent and intensive use of the land. Under this productive model of the traditional agriculture, based on the slash and burn method, the land remained unproductive for long periods of time. In contrast, coffee offered the possibility of having an intense agriculture, without major technical requirements and without sacrificing the cultivation of subsistence crops, thus generating the conditions for the expansion of a new coffee culture, dominated by small farms.

From 1905 to 1907 to the present

Although this new breed of coffee made of country farmers demonstrated a significant capacity to grow at the margin of current international prices, Colombia did not have a relatively important dynamism in the global market of this product. During the period between 1905 and 1935 the coffee industry in Colombia grew dynamically thanks to the vision and long term politics derived from the creation of the Federación Nacional de Cafeteros de Colombia (National Federation of Coffee Growers of Colombia) in 1927.

The union of local farmers and small producers around the Federation permitted them to confront logistical and commercial difficulties that would not have been possible individually. With time and through the research made at Cenicafé, founded in 1938, and the Federation's agricultural Extension Service, improved cultivation systems. More efficient spatial patterns were developed that permitted the differentiation of the product and supported its quality. Currently the Land of Coffee in Colombia includes all of the mountain ranges and other mountainous regions of the country, and generates income for over 500,000 coffee farming families.

Climate change

While a 2011 New York Times article claimed that regional climate change associated with global warming had caused Colombian coffee production to decline from 12 million 132-pound bags, the standard measure, to 9 million bags between 2006 - 2010, with average temperatures rising 1 degree Celsius between 1980 and 2010, and average precipitation increasing 25 percent in the preceding years, disrupting the specific climatic requirements of the Coffea arabica bean, yields of Colombia coffee increased significantly from 2011 to 2018 to 14.2 million bags.

Colombian coffee growing axis

The coffee growing axis, also known as the coffee triangle is a part of the Colombian Paisa region. There are three departments in the area: Caldas, Quindío and Risaralda. These departments are among the smallest departments in Colombia with a total combined area of 13873 km2 (5356 mi2), about 1.2% of the Colombian territory. The combined population is 2,291,195 (2005 census). In 2011 UNESCO declared the region a World Heritage site.

Marketing

National Federation of Coffee Growers of Colombia

The National Federation of Coffee Growers of Colombia is a non-profit business association, popularly known for its "Juan Valdez" marketing campaign. The federation was founded in 1927 as a business cooperative that promotes the production and exportation of Colombian coffee. It currently represents more than 500,000 producers, most of whom are small family owned farms. The federation supports research and development in the production of coffee through grants to local universities and through federation sponsored research institutes. The federation also monitors production to ensure export quality standards are met. The Federation was founded with three objectives: 1) to protect the industry, 2) to study its problems, and 3) to further its interests. The Juan Valdez branding concept was developed in 1981 to distinguish 100% Colombian coffee from coffee blended with beans from other countries. The trademark made its first TV appearance in 1983 featuring a country farmer carrying coffee on his mule.

Juan Valdez

National Coffee Park

See also

Astrid Medina
2013 Colombian coffee growers strike

References

External links
 
 Coffee Cultural Landscape of Colombia, UNESCO, unesco.org
 Coffee production in Sierra Nevada de Santa Marta 

Agriculture in Colombia
Coffee in Colombia
Colombia
Economy of Colombia
Products with protected designation of origin